This is a list of the subdivisions of Greece.

Administrative divisions

 Mount Athos
 Municipalities and communities of Greece
 LAU 1 Municipalities/Communities (Dimoi/Koinotites) until 2010: 1034
 LAU 2 Municipal Districts/Community Districts (Demotiko Diamerisma/Koinotiko Diamerisma): 6130
 List of municipalities and communities in Greece (1997–2010)
 List of municipalities of Greece (2011)
 Prefectures of Greece (first existed in 1833, last abolished in 2010, by 2010 there were 51) / , called departments in ISO 3166-2:GR
 Provinces of Greece 147, last abolished in 2006 / , "eparchy"
 Regional units of Greece / 74 / Περιφερειακή ενότητα / NUTS 3
 Regions of Greece / 13, περιφέρειες / NUTS 2
 Super-prefectures of Greece, there were three

Others 
 Geographic regions of Greece / nine regions, six with land on the mainland and three only including islands / 
 NUTS statistical regions of Greece
 NUTS1 Groups of Development Regions
 Parliamentary constituencies of Greece

 
Greece